"Many Shades of Black" is a song by the band The Raconteurs. It appears as the eighth track on their second album, Consolers of the Lonely. It is second single from the album and was made available in 7" vinyl format. The cover art depicts Mary Todd Lincoln or Abraham Lincoln depending on the way the inner sleeve is turned. The track is also available as downloadable content for the music video game Rock Band 2.

The release of the single contains a version of the song performed by British singer Adele. Adele has performed this song live several times, including during her An Evening with Adele tour and it was included in the deluxe edition of her 19 album. The Adele version was featured in the ending of 90210 episode "Wild Alaskan Salmon" (episode 6, season 2).

Chart positions
The song peaked at number 37 on the U.S. Hot Modern Rock Tracks chart.

Track listing
"Many Shades of Black"
"Many Shades of Black"

References

External links
Lyrics at MTV.com

2008 singles
2008 songs
Adele songs
The Raconteurs songs
Songs written by Brendan Benson
Songs written by Jack White
Third Man Records singles
Warner Records singles